Tomi Kult (born 4 July 2000) is a Finnish professional footballer who plays for Reipas, as a striker.

References

2000 births
Living people
Finnish footballers
FC Kuusysi players
FC Lahti players
Pallokerho Keski-Uusimaa players
Reipas Lahti players
AC Kajaani players
Kakkonen players
Veikkausliiga players
Association football forwards
People from Lieto
Sportspeople from Southwest Finland